State Center is a city in Marshall County, Iowa, United States. The population was 1,391 at the time of the 2020 census. State Center is known as the Rose Capital of Iowa.

History
State Center got its start in the year 1864, following construction of the railroad through the territory. It was named for its location near the geographical center of the state.

Geography

Demographics

2010 census
As of the census of 2010, there were 1,468 people, 568 households, and 399 families living in the city. The racial makeup of the city was 96.7% White, 0.5% African American, 0.1% Native American, 0.3% Asian, 1.2% from other races, and 1.2% from two or more races. Hispanic or Latino of any race were 3.5% of the population.

There were 568 households, of which 36.6% had children under the age of 18 living with them, 54.9% were married couples living together, 11.3% had a female householder with no husband present, 4.0% had a male householder with no wife present, and 29.8% were non-families. 24.6% of all households were made up of individuals, and 12.7% had someone living alone who was 65 years of age or older. The average household size was 2.52 and the average family size was 3.02.

The median age in the city was 39.2 years. 28.1% of residents were under the age of 18; 5.9% were between the ages of 18 and 24; 23.6% were from 25 to 44; 25.5% were from 45 to 64; and 16.9% were 65 years of age or older. The gender makeup of the city was 49.7% male and 50.3% female.

2000 census
As of the census of 2000, there were 1,349 people, 559 households, and 354 families living in the city. The racial makeup of the city was 97.78% White, 0.15% Native American, 0.07% Asian, 1.11% from other races, and 0.89% from two or more races. Hispanic or Latino of any race were 1.85% of the population.

There were 559 households, out of which 29.9% had children under the age of 18 living with them, 53.8% were married couples living together, 5.7% had a female householder with no husband present, and 36.5% were non-families. 33.3% of all households were made up of individuals, and 18.4% had someone living alone who was 65 years of age or older. The average household size was 2.35 and the average family size was 3.00.

25.4% are under the age of 18, 6.7% from 18 to 24, 27.1% from 25 to 44, 20.6% from 45 to 64, and 20.2% who were 65 years of age or older. The median age was 39 years. For every 100 females, there were 90.5 males. For every 100 females age 18 and over, there were 86.8 males.

The median income for a household in the city was $35,766, and the median income for a family was $45,156. Males had a median income of $33,661 versus $25,156 for females. The per capita income for the city was $17,744. About 5.7% of families and 8.7% of the population were below the poverty line, including 15.4% of those under age 18 and 5.7% of those age 65 or over.

Education
Schools include West Marshall Elementary, West Marshall Middle School, and West Marshall High School.

See also
Dobbin Round Barn, listed on the National Register of Historic Places
Watson's Grocery, also listed on the National Register of Historic Places

References

External links 
 
City of State Center website

1864 establishments in Iowa
Populated places established in 1864
Cities in Marshall County, Iowa
Cities in Iowa